Giovanni Augusto Oliveira Cardoso (born 5 September 1989), known as Giovanni Augusto, is a Brazilian professional footballer who plays as an attacking midfielder for Guarani.

Club career

Atlético Mineiro and loans
Born in Belém, Pará, Giovanni Augusto graduated from Atlético Mineiro's youth setup. He made his first team debut on 17 March 2010, coming on as a second half substitute in a 0–1 away loss against Chapecoense, for that year's Copa do Brasil.

After appearing rarely, Giovanni Augusto was loaned to Náutico in May 2010. He returned to Galo in 2011, but spent the following campaigns out on loan to Grêmio Barueri, Criciúma, Náutico, ABC and Figueirense.

With Figueira Giovanni Augusto appeared regularly in Série A, avoiding relegation and scoring four goals in 24 appearances. He also scored the first official goal of Arena Corinthians on 18 May 2014, in a 1–1 draw against Corinthians.

Giovanni Augusto only established himself as a starter for Galo during the 2015 campaign, under Levir Culpi. On 5 May he renewed his contract until 2018, and finished the year with five goals and ten assists.

Corinthians
On 4 February 2016, it was announced that Giovanni signed with Corinthians for an undisclosed fee.

In March 2019, he joined Goiás on loan until the end of the season.

Mazatlán
On 11 January 2021, it was announced that Giovanni signed with Mexican team Mazatlán for an undisclosed fee.

Career statistics

Honours
Atlético Mineiro
 Campeonato Mineiro: 2015

Corinthians
Campeonato Brasileiro Série A: 2017
Campeonato Paulista: 2017

References

External links
 

1989 births
Living people
Sportspeople from Belém
Brazilian footballers
Association football midfielders
Campeonato Brasileiro Série A players
Campeonato Brasileiro Série B players
Clube Atlético Mineiro players
Clube Náutico Capibaribe players
Grêmio Barueri Futebol players
Criciúma Esporte Clube players
ABC Futebol Clube players
Figueirense FC players
Sport Club Corinthians Paulista players
CR Vasco da Gama players
Goiás Esporte Clube players
Mazatlán F.C. footballers
Guarani FC players